Jared R. Tinklenberg was an American professor of psychiatry and behavioral sciences.  Tinklenberg passed away on November 18, 2020 at age 80.

Education 
Tinklenberg held a Doctor of Medicine degree from the University of Iowa.

Career 
Tinklenberg was a professor emeritus of psychiatry and behavioral sciences at Stanford University School of Medicine. He was the Associate Chief of Staff for Mental Health Research and Education at the VA Palo Alto Health Care System. Tinklenberg was a co-principal investigator and co-director of the Stanford/VA California Alzheimer's Disease Center.

Research 
Tinklenberg's areas of research included the psychopharmacology of dementia and Alzheimer's disease.

Awards and honors 
Tinklenberg was a Fellow emeritus of the American College of Neuropsychopharmacology. In 2017, to honor Tinklenberg's 50-year career as a medical school professor, his daughter Karla Jurvetson helped fund the construction of the new Stanford Medical Center and endowed the Jared and Mae Tinklenberg Professorship in her parents' names.

Personal life 
Tinklenberg was born on November 25, 1939 in South Dakota, the son of a Christian minister who worked for the U.S. Navy. He met his wife, Mae (Van der Weerd) at the University of Iowa while he was in medical school, and they married in 1964. They moved to New Haven, CT for his internship, where their daughter Karla Jurvetson was born in 1966, and then to Palo Alto, where their daughter Julie Tinklenberg was born in 1968. Tinklenberg was also a long-time member of First Congregational Church in Palo Alto, and he enjoyed running marathons in his younger years, birdwatching more recently, and hiking with his family throughout his life.

Selected works

Books

References 

Living people
Year of birth missing (living people)
Stanford University School of Medicine faculty
American psychiatrists
20th-century American scientists
21st-century American scientists
20th-century American educators
21st-century American educators